Jarkko Nieminen and André Sá were the defending champions, but Nieminen did not compete due to his retirement from professional tennis. Sá played alongside Máximo González, but lost in the first round to Gero Kretschmer and Alexander Satschko.
Juan Sebastián Cabal and Robert Farah won the title, defeating Iñigo Cervantes and Paolo Lorenzi in the final, 6–3, 6–0.

Seeds

Draw

Draw

References
 Main Draw

Argentina Open - Doubles
2016 Doubles